All My Best is a 1985 Ricky Nelson album. Although the record is a collection of greatest hits, it is not a compilation but a new studio recording. Nelson conceived the album for his own Silver Eagle label and promoted the record himself on late-night television.

Nelson recruited the Jordanaires to provide backing vocals, as well as familiar session musicians. Since Nelson's session musicians had not performed the songs for many years, some differences from the original recordings are audible on the album.

Track listing

Charts

References

1985 albums
Ricky Nelson albums